James Blakedon O.P., D.Th. (died 1464) was a medieval prelate who served as Bishop of Achonry from 1442 to 1453, then Bishop of Bangor from 1453 to 1464.

A Dominican friar and Doctor of Theology, he was born in Blakedon (or Blackdon) in Somerset, England. He was appointed Bishop of Achonry in Ireland by the Holy See on 15 October 1442, although it is not known if he ever made a visitation to that diocese. He did act as a suffragan bishop in the English dioceses of Salisbury, Bath & Wells, Exeter, and Worcester between 1442 and 1453. He was translated to the bishopric of Bangor in Wales on 7 February 1453. Around that time he also became Master of St Catherine's Hospital at Bedminster, Bristol. He held those two last appointments until his death, sometime before 3 October 1464.

References

Bibliography

  
 
 

1464 deaths
15th-century English Roman Catholic bishops
Bishops of Achonry
Bishops of Bangor
People from Somerset
Year of birth unknown
15th-century Roman Catholic bishops in Ireland